Laurent Estadieu (born 4 August 1975) is a French former road cyclist, who competed professionally from 2000 to 2002 with .

Major results
1999
 1st Tour du Finistère
 1st Stage 4 
2001
 1st Overall Tour de la Somme
 8th Tour du Doubs
2002
 9th GP de Villers-Cotterêts
 10th Boucles de l'Aulne
2003
 1st Stage 3

References

External links

1975 births
Living people
French male cyclists
People from Saint-Gaudens, Haute-Garonne
Cyclists from Occitania (administrative region)
Sportspeople from Haute-Garonne